Fredrik Lystad Jacobsen (born February 15, 1990) is a Norwegian professional ice hockey player. He was a member of the Norwegian squad at the 2014 Winter Olympics.

References

External links
Sochi2014 Profile 
Elite Prospects Profile

1990 births
Living people
People from Asker
Norwegian ice hockey forwards
Frisk Asker Ishockey players
Sparta Warriors players
Storhamar Dragons players
Olympic ice hockey players of Norway
Ice hockey players at the 2014 Winter Olympics
Sportspeople from Viken (county)